Collage is an album by American jazz percussion ensemble M'Boom led by Max Roach recorded in 1984 for the Italian Soul Note label.

Reception
The Allmusic review by Ken Dryden awarded the album 3 stars stating "While listening to the mix of different instruments from track to track is fun, this CD is better savored a track or two at a time than trying to absorb the whole thing in one sitting".

Track listing
All compositions by Max Roach except as indicated
 "Circles" (Joe Chambers) - 7:28 
 "It's Time" - 5:32 
 "Jamaican Sun" (Roy Brooks) - 6:24 
 "Street Dance" - 5:32 
 "Mr. Seven" (Warren Smith) - 10:54 
 "A Quiet Place" - 6:40 
Recorded at Vanguard Studios in New York City on October 16, 17 & 18, 1984

Personnel
Max Roach - bass drum, vibes, marimba percussion, concert snare
Kenyatte Abdur-Rahman - xylophone, cabasa, claves, percussion, bass drum
Joe Chambers - marimba, bass marimba, xylophone
Eli Fountain - xylophone, vibes, bass drum, bells, snare drum, crotales 
Freddie Waits - tom-tom, percussion, shaker, bass marimba
Ray Mantilla - conga, timpani, bongos, bells, chimes
Warren Smith - timpani, vibes, bass marimba, percussion
Eddie Allen - woodblocks, percussion, claves, cabasa, bell tree, cymbal, triangle, finger cymbal
Roy Brooks - slapstick, percussion, steel drum, musical saw, tom-tom
Fred King - concert bells, cowbell, timpani, vibes

References

Black Saint/Soul Note albums
Max Roach albums
M'Boom albums
1984 albums